Milton Arthur Morris AO (2 April 1924 – 27 February 2019) was an Australian politician who represented the Electoral district of Maitland between 3 March 1956 and 29 August 1980 for the Liberal Party. He helped pass several laws promoting automobile safety.

Early life
He was born in April 1924 at Mayfield, New South Wales, to Arthur Henry Morris, a railway guard, and his wife Janet Thomson. He was educated at Wickham Public School and Newcastle Junior Boys High School. Morris briefly joined the Royal Australian Navy in 1942 before transferring to the part-time Volunteer Defence Corps, where he served as an anti-aircraft gunner from 1942 until 1945. He married Colleen Joan Burgess on 13 October 1945. They had one son and three daughters.

Political career
Morris joined the Liberal Party in 1954 and was a member of the Tarro Branch of the Party. He was a Councillor on the Lower Hunter Shire (1954–1958). With the retirement of Incumbent member for Maitland, Walter Howarth, Morris was preselected by the Liberal Party and won the seat at that election. He subsequently won re-election at the 1956, 1959, 1962, 1965, 1968, 1971, 1973, 1976 and 1978 New South Wales State elections.

During his political career Morris held various portfolios in the Askin Government, Lewis Government and Willis Government including Minister for Transport (1965–1975). During his tenure of that portfolio, he introduced the breathalyser, radar speed traps, compulsory wearing of seat belts and a number of other road-safety initiatives partly though his formation of the scientifically-based Traffic Accident Research Unit, led by Dr Michael Henderson. He was also Minister for Lands, Minister for Forests (1975–1975) and Minister for Decentralisation and Development (1976–1976).

On 25 June 1972 in Sydney's The Sun-Herald newspaper, an article by motoring journalist, television commentator and successful rally driver Evan Green entitled "160 MPH 'Super Cars' Soon" about proposed high powered V8 engined cars from Holden, Ford and Chrysler Australia that were being developed for the annual Bathurst 500 mile race would and soon be on sale to the Australian public, quoted Morris as saying that he was appalled at these cars—which he labelled "bullets on wheels". This article and Morris' comment would set in motion the so-called Supercar scare which would see the V8 powered Holden LJ Torana GTR XU-1, Ford Falcon GTHO Phase IV and the Chrysler Valiant Charger scrapped by their respective manufacturers.

He resigned from his seat of Maitland on 29 August 1980 to contest the New South Wales Federal Seat of Lyne for the Liberal Party. The Lyne contest was a three cornered contest between the Labor Party candidate, National Country Party candidate Bruce Cowan and himself. The results of the 1980 Lyne election were close with Morris coming within 2.9% of out voting his National Country opponent and winning through preferences against the Labor candidate in a heavily conservative seat. On his departure from parliament, he was permitted by Queen Elizabeth II, on the Governor's recommendation, to continue to use the title "The Honourable".

Later life
Morris had not contested any election since his Lyne campaign. In a 2008 interview with the Maitland Mercury it was noted that he had the nickname 'Mr Maitland'. In the interview he claimed that he had no regrets about not re-entering politics, but did say that if given the chance would jump at it. "I loved every minute of it [being Transport Minister]". Morris died in his sleep on 27 February 2019.

Community activity and honours
 Chairman of Hunter Valley Training.
 Honorary Chairman of Lewis House Apprentice Hostel, Mayfield
 Patron of East Maitland sub branch, Returned Serviceman's League.
 Patron – The Mai-Wel Group.
 Patron – Waratah Brass
 Honorary Prefect of Hunter Christian School (formerly Mayfield Christian Community School)
 Patron - Sydney Heritage Fleet  (1965-1986)

Honours
 Officer of the Order of Australia (AO) – 1988, for his contribution to politics, youth and the community.
 Officer's Cross of the Order of Polonia Restituta (Poland) – 1989,  for service to Poland and its people.

References

 

1924 births
2019 deaths
Australian businesspeople
Volunteer Defence Corps soldiers
Liberal Party of Australia members of the Parliament of New South Wales
Members of the New South Wales Legislative Assembly
New South Wales local councillors
Officers of the Order of Australia
Officers of the Order of Polonia Restituta
Royal Australian Navy personnel of World War II
Royal Australian Navy sailors
Deaths from cerebrovascular disease